The Darlington Open Tournament. also known as the Darlington Association Tournament   was a late Victorian era men's and women's grass court tennis tournament founded in 1881. It was organised by the Darlington Outdoor's Sports Association and held at the Feethams Cricket Ground Darlington, County Durham, England. The tournament ran annually for twelve editions until 1893.

History
Darlington Open Tournament was founded in 1881 by the Darlington Outdoor's Sports Association, and held at the Feethams Cricket Ground Darlington, County Durham, England until 1893. The inaugural was held from 1 August to 6 August 1881. The winner of the men's singles was Mr. Mark Fenwick who defeated Mr. Arthur Richard Springett. The women's singles was won by Miss Ethel Surtees who defeated Miss Alice Cheese.

A local newspaper report of the event that concluded on early August 1882:

The final edition concluded on 12 August 1893 the winner of men's singles was Mr. Harold Mahony and the winner of the women's singles was Miss Charlotte Cooper.

Other notable winners of this title in the men's singles include Herbert William Wrangham Wilberforce (1883, 1887, 1888) and Patrick Bowes-Lyon (1884–1886). Whilst former women's singles winners included Helen Jackson (1887) and Lottie Dod (1888). Of note the ladies singles tournament was not played at every edition.

Finals

Men's Singles

Men's Doubles

Women's Single's

Women's Doubles

Mixed Doubles

Notes
Challenge Round: the final round of a tournament, in which the winner of a single-elimination phase faces the previous year's champion, who plays only that one match. The challenge round was used in the early history of tennis (from 1877 through 1921), in some tournaments not all.* Indicates challenger

The Minden family were closely associated with this tournament, who within a couple of years had emigrated to New Zealand. Percival Clennell Fenwick won the inaugural New Zealand Lawn Tennis Championships in 1886 and again in 1887, 1888. His brother Minden Fenwick the won the title in 1889–1890.

References

Sources
 McLintock, Alexander Hare; McLintock, Alexander Hare; Taonga, New Zealand Ministry for Culture and Heritage Te Manatu. "New Zealand Championships". An encyclopaedia of New Zealand, edited by A. H. McLintock, 1966. Ministry of Culture and Heritage.
 Routledges Sporting Annual (1882) George Routledge and Son. London.
 Routledges Sporting Annual (1883) George Routledge and Son. London.
 The Northern Echo (2008) Darlington, County Durham, England.

Defunct tennis tournaments in the United Kingdom
Grass court tennis tournaments